To Watch the Storms is the 16th studio album by Steve Hackett. It was his first studio album in 4 years since Darktown in 1999. It was recorded with his then touring band including his brother John and producer and keyboardist Roger King. The album was released in three formats including a standard and special editions. Cover artwork was by Kim Poor. There was also a Japanese edition with an extra track not included on the UK releases and alternate cover art, also by Kim Poor.

Track listing
All songs written by Steve Hackett except where indicated.

Standard Edition (CAMCD31)
 "Strutton Ground"
 "Circus of Becoming"
 "The Devil Is an Englishman" (Thomas Dolby)
 "Frozen Statues" (Steve Hackett, Roger King)
 "Mechanical Bride"
 "Wind, Sand and Stars"
 "Brand New" (Steve Hackett, Roger King)
 "This World" (Steve Hackett, Kim Poor)
 "Rebecca"
 "The Silk Road" (Steve Hackett, Roger King)
 "Come Away"
 "The Moon Under Water"
 "Serpentine Song"

Special Edition (CAMCD31SE)
Includes four bonus tracks, a 40-page booklet with extended sleeve notes from Steve and original Kim Poor artwork for each track. Packaged in slipcase.
 "Strutton Ground"
 "Circus of Becoming"
 "The Devil Is an Englishman" (Thomas Dolby)
 "Frozen Statues" (Steve Hackett, Roger King)
 "Mechanical Bride"
 "Wind, Sand and Stars"
 "Brand New" (Steve Hackett, Roger King)
 "This World" (Steve Hackett, Kim Poor)
 "Rebecca"
 "The Silk Road" (Steve Hackett, Roger King)
 "Pollution B"
 "Fire Island"
 "Marijuana Assassin of Youth"
 "Come Away"
 "The Moon Under Water"
 "Serpentine Song"
 "If You Only Knew"

Japanese Edition (UICE1064)
Includes four bonus tracks and an obi strip. Packaged in a slipcase.
 "Strutton Ground"
 "Brand New" (Steve Hackett, Roger King)
 "This World" (Steve Hackett, Kim Poor)
 "Circus of Becoming"
 "The Devil Is an Englishman" (Thomas Dolby)
 "Frozen Statues" (Steve Hackett, Roger King)
 "Mechanical Bride"
 "Wind, Sand and Stars"
 "Rebecca"
 "The Silk Road" (Steve Hackett, Roger King)
 "Come Away"
 "The Moon Under Water"
 "Serpentine Song"
 "Flame"
 "Pollution B"
 "Fire Island"
 "If You Only Knew"

Digital Downloads
 Brand New (edit) (Steve Hackett, Roger King)

Personnel 
 Steve Hackett – Vocals, Guitar
 Roger King – Keyboards
 Rob Townsend – Brass, Woodwind
 Terry Gregory – Bass, Vocals
 Gary O'Toole – Drums, Vocals
 John Hackett – Flute on "Serpentine Song"
 Ian McDonald – Saxophone on "Brand New"
 Jeanne Downs – Backing Vocals
 Sarah Wilson – Cello
 Howard Gott – Violin

References

2003 albums
Steve Hackett albums